Amara apricaria is a species of beetle of the genus Amara in the family Carabidae. It is native to Europe.

References

apricaria
Beetles described in 1790